Bert Anthony Adams (October 23, 1916 – February 3, 2003) was a decorated war veteran who served from 1956 to 1968 as a Democratic member of the Louisiana House of Representatives from Leesville in Vernon Parish in western Louisiana.

Biography 
Born in DeRidder in Beauregard Parish, Adams was a decorated United States Army veteran of World War II and the Korean War.

Adams won his second term in the Democratic primary election held on December 5, 1959.

Private life

References

1916 births
2003 deaths
20th-century American politicians
Democratic Party members of the Louisiana House of Representatives
United States Army officers
United States Army personnel of World War II
United States Army personnel of the Korean War
People from DeRidder, Louisiana
People from Leesville, Louisiana
Military personnel from Louisiana